Chengbu Miao Autonomous County, usually referred to as Chengbu County or abbreviated just as Chengbu, is an autonomous county of Miao people in the Province of Hunan, China, it is under the administration of Shaoyang City.

Located on the south western margin of Hunan, the county is bordered to the northeast by Wugang City, to the northwest by Suining County, to the southwest by Longsheng Autonomous County of Guangxi, to the southeast by Ziyuan County of Guangxi, to the south by Xinning County. The county has six towns and six townships under its jurisdiction, the county seat is Chengbei Community of Rulin Town.

Administrative division
Chengbu Miao Autonomous County has 6 towns and 6 townships.

As of October 2015, Chengbu Miao Autonomous County has six townships and six towns under its jurisdiction. The county seat is the town of Rulin.

Geography
Chengbu Miao Autonomous County is located in the southwestern Hunan province. It lies in the upper reaches of the Wu River. The county shares a border with Wugang to the north, Xinning County to the east, Guangxi Zhuang Autonomous Region to the southeast and south, and Tongdao Dong Autonomous County and Suining County to the west. Chengbu Miao Autonomous County is surrounded by mountains in the east, south and west, high in the southern area and low in the northern area, with a large undulating terrain. The terrain is mainly mountainous and distributes in zones.

Climate
Chengbu Miao Autonomous County is in the subtropical monsoon climate zone and exhibits four distinct seasons.

Rivers
Chengbu Miao Autonomous County has 816 rivers and streams.

Wu River, formerly known as "Xiong River" and commonly known as "Yun River", is a tributary of Yuan River and the largest river in Chengbu Miao Autonomous County. It rises on the southwestern slopes of the Wu Mountain and discharges to Yuan River in Hongjiang City.

Xun River, formerly known as "Tan River", is the second largest river in the county. It rises on the southeastern slopes of the Huangshan or Yellow Mountain and discharges to Rong River in Guangxi.

Zi River, also known as "Hao River", "Ji River" or "Duliang River", rises on the Guangfu Mountain and joins Dongting Lake.

Qu River, also known as "Changping River", rises on the northwestern slopes of the Nanshan or Southern Mountain and discharges to Yuan River.

Mountains
Other famous mountains are Mount Jinzi, Mount Longxuyan, Nanshan or Southern Mountain, Laoshan or the Old Mountain, and Mount Huangzhu.

Demographics
As of 2017, the National Bureau of Statistics of the People's Republic of China estimates the county's population now to be 292,033.

Ethnicity

According to the 2010 Census, the ethnic makeup of Chengbu Miao Autonomous County included: 148,232 Miao people (59.14%), 94,051 Han people (37.53%), 3,288 Dong people (1.31%), 2,363 Yao people (0.94%), and 1,654 Hui people (0.66%).

Language
Mandarin is the official language. The local people speak Kam language, Hmongic languages, and Dungan language.

Religion
The Dong and Miao people believe in animism and worship ancestors. Buddhism is the earliest foreign religion introduced in the county. Islam spread as Hui people moved into the area.

Education
By the end of 2017, Chengbu Miao Autonomous County had two county vocational secondary schools, 25 high schools and middle schools, 139 primary schools, and 47 kindergartens.

Transportation

Expressway
The S86 Wugang-Jingzhou Expressway runs northwest to east through the northern county's towns of Xiyan and Maoping and Jiangfang Township.

Provincial Highway
The Provincial Highway S219 connects the county to Wugang to the north and connects to Provincial Highway S319 to the west.

The Provincial Highway S319 is a north–south highway passing through commercial and residential districts of the county limits.

Culture
Chengbu Miao Autonomous County is rich in culture and customs. The Meishan Culture, Witchcraft Culture and Folk Songs are the most notable.

Tourism
Chengbu Miao Autonomous County enjoys rich natural landscapes. The most popular natural scenic spots are Nanshan Scenic Area or Nanshan Grasslands, Chang'anying Scenic Area, Shiwan Gutian, Baiyun Lake, Liangjiang Gorge, Shajiaodong Nature Reserves.

Chengbu Miao Autonomous County is also the hometown for many celebrities. It has a large number of former residences, such as the Former Residence of Yang Wanzhe, Former Residence of Wang Lin, Former Residence of Lan Yu, and the Former Residence of Gong Jichang.

Chengbu Miao Autonomous County's most notable feature is its ancient bridges, built in the Song, Yuan, Ming and Qing dynasties (960–1911). The Fengyu Bridge is the oldest bridge in the county, which was originally built in the Song dynasty (960–1279). Other ancient bridges are the Guma Bridge, Fushou Bridge, Yao Bridge, Liuxi Bridge, Luohan Bridge, Huilong Bridge, and Yongzhen Bridge.

The Confucian Temple is the largest temple complex in the county. It was built in 1889 during the ruling of Guangxu Emperor of the Qing dynasty (1644–1911). The Baiyun Temple is a Buddhist temple in the county and Feishan Temple is a Taoist temple in the county.

Notable people
Chengbu Miao Autonomous County is the birthplace of:
 Yang Zaixing, a general in the Song dynasty (960–1279).
 Yang Zhengheng, an official in late Yuan dynasty (1271–1368).
 Lan Yu, a general in late Yuan dynasty (1271–1368) and early Ming dynasty (1368–1644).
 Gong Jichang, a general in the Qing dynasty (1644–1911).
 Duan Menghui, journalist.
 Chen Qiufa, former Director of the China National Space Administration from 2010 to 2013.

References

Bibliography

External links
 www.xzqh.org 

 
County-level divisions of Hunan
Shaoyang
Miao autonomous counties